Jamila Madeira (born 17 July 1975) is a Portuguese politician and Member of the European Parliament for the Socialist Party; part of the Party of European Socialists.

She was part of the National Board of Juventude Socialista from 1994 to 2000, and then became its General Secretary from 2000 to 2004. She was a member of the Assembly of the Republic from 1999 to 2004.

References

External links
Official website

1975 births
Living people
Women members of the Assembly of the Republic (Portugal)
Members of the Assembly of the Republic (Portugal)
Socialist Party (Portugal) MEPs
MEPs for Portugal 2004–2009
21st-century women MEPs for Portugal
Socialist Party (Portugal) politicians
Technical University of Lisbon alumni
People from Loulé
20th-century Portuguese politicians
20th-century Portuguese women politicians
21st-century Portuguese politicians